The Punisher (Francis "Frank" Castle, born Castiglione) is an antihero appearing in American comic books published by Marvel Comics. The character was created by writer Gerry Conway and artists John Romita Sr. and Ross Andru. The Punisher made his first appearance in The Amazing Spider-Man #129 (cover-dated February 1974), originally depicted as an assassin and adversary of the superhero Spider-Man.

The character is depicted as an Italian-American vigilante who employs murder, kidnapping, extortion, coercion, threats of violence, and torture in his campaign against crime. Driven by the deaths of his wife and two children, who were killed by the mob for witnessing a killing in New York City's Central Park, the Punisher wages a one-man war on crime.  A veteran (originally of the Vietnam War and later updated alternately to the fictional Siancong War and the Iraq War) U.S. Marine Corps Scout/Sniper in Force Recon, Castle is skilled in hand-to-hand combat, guerrilla warfare, and marksmanship. He is well known for the skull motif on his chest, originally envisioned by his creators as a skull-and-crossbones symbol on his right breast. Following the widespread appropriation of this logo by far-right movements, it was officially retired from active use by Marvel Entertainment in 2022, replaced by a new horned-skull motif inspired by the Japanese mythological demon Oni.

The Punisher's brutal nature and willingness to kill made him an anomaly in mainstream American comic books when he debuted in 1974. By the late 1980s, the Punisher was part of a wave of psychologically troubled antiheroes. At the height of his popularity, the character was featured in four monthly publications: The Punisher, The Punisher War Journal, The Punisher: War Zone, and The Punisher Armory. An alternate future version of the character dubbed the Cosmic Ghost Rider, created by Donny Cates and Geoff Shaw, began publication in 2018 as a Thanos supporting character, becoming a breakout character and receiving his own ongoing series, often coming into opposition with his past self. In 2017, following the 2016 Civil War II storyline, where Jim "Rhodey" Rhodes met his death at the hands of Thanos, Nick Fury, Jr. obtained the War Machine armor from a black market syndicate and persuaded Punisher to don the armor and carry on in Rhodes' name, succeeding him as the second War Machine for a short while, customizing the armor with his skull motif. Following Rhodes' resurrection alongside Tony Stark for the Marvel Legacy initiative, Castle relinquished the armor and title to him and resumed as Punisher.

Despite his violent actions and dark nature, the Punisher has enjoyed some mainstream success on television, making guest appearances on series such as Spider-Man and The Super Hero Squad Show, where the depiction of his violent behavior was toned down for family viewers. 

In feature films, Dolph Lundgren portrayed the character in the 1989 film The Punisher, as did Thomas Jane in the 2004 film The Punisher, and Ray Stevenson in 2008's Punisher: War Zone. Jon Bernthal portrayed the character in the second season of Daredevil and the spin-off The Punisher, set in the Marvel Cinematic Universe (MCU).

Publication history

First appearance
The Punisher was conceived by Gerry Conway, then-writer of The Amazing Spider-Man, and was inspired by The Executioner, a popular book series created by author Don Pendleton, in which a Vietnam veteran, Mack Bolan, becomes a serial killer of criminals after the Mafia-related deaths of his family. Conway said in a 1987 interview that "I was fascinated by the Don Pendleton Executioner character, which was fairly popular at the time, and I wanted to do something that was inspired by that, although not to my mind a copy of it. And while I was doing the Jackal storyline, the opportunity came for a character who would be used by the Jackal to make Spider-Man's life miserable. The Punisher seemed to fit."

Conway also helped design the character's distinctive costume. As Conway recalled in 2002, "In the '70s, when I was writing comics at DC and Marvel, I made it a practice to sketch my own ideas for the costumes of new characters—heroes and villains—which I offered to the artists as a crude suggestion representing the image I had in mind. I had done that with the Punisher at Marvel." Conway had drawn a character with a small death's head skull on one breast. Marvel art director John Romita, Sr. took the basic design and blew the skull up to huge size, taking up most of the character's chest. Amazing Spider-Man penciller Ross Andru was the first artist to draw the character for publication.

Stan Lee, then Marvel's editor-in-chief, recalled in 2005 that he had suggested the character's name:

Appearing for the first time in The Amazing Spider-Man #129 (Feb. 1974), the Punisher was initially an antagonist of the titular hero. He was portrayed as a bloodthirsty vigilante who had no qualms about killing gangsters, something which most superheroes of the time refrained from doing. J. Jonah Jameson described him as "the most newsworthy thing to happen to New York since Boss Tweed". In this appearance, the Punisher is determined to kill Spider-Man, who is wanted for the apparent murder of Norman Osborn. The Punisher is shown as a formidable fighter, skilled marksman, and able strategist. All he reveals about himself is that he is a former U.S. Marine. He has a fierce temper but also shows signs of considerable frustration over his self-appointed role of killer vigilante. He is engaged in extensive soul-searching as to what is the right thing to do: although he has few qualms about killing, he is outraged when his then-associate, the Jackal, apparently kills an enemy by treacherous means rather than in honorable combat. Spider-Man, who is himself no stranger to such torment, concludes that the Punisher's problems made his own seem like a "birthday party".

The character was a hit with readers and started to appear on a regular basis, teaming up with both Spider-Man and other heroes such as Captain America and Nightcrawler throughout the 1970s and early 1980s. Conway said the Punisher's popularity took him by surprise, as he had intended him only as a second-tier character. During his acclaimed run on Daredevil, writer and artist Frank Miller made use of the character, contrasting his attitudes and version of vigilante action to that of the more liberal character of Daredevil.

Initial series
In the early 1980s, writer and college student Steven Grant was at a comics convention in New York City over the Christmas break. At the time he was living with Duffy Vohland, an employee in Marvel's production department. Vohland encouraged Grant to pitch story ideas to Marvel, and arranged an interview with then-editor-in-chief Marv Wolfman, with whom Grant would become good friends. Grant sat at Vohland's typewriter for a day and wrote three ideas: One involved the Black Knight and one was the Punisher, since those were characters he liked that as far as Grant knew, no other Marvel writer was working with at the time. Unbeknownst to Grant, the Punisher, as it turned out, was the lead in a black-and-white magazine being written by Archie Goodwin, making the character unavailable for Grant's use. A couple of years later Grant began writing for Marvel after another friend, Roger Stern, became a Marvel editor there and asked Grant to write something for him. In 1979, Marvel began considering publishing miniseries, which Grant had been lobbying for some time. Grant began pushing for a Punisher miniseries, but this was met with disinterest from editorial, as the character was not thought of as one that readers would care about. The following year, Grant collaborated on Marvel Team-Up #94 with artist Mike Zeck. In 1984, Zeck illustrated Marvel's first Secret Wars miniseries, which raised his profile in the Marvel offices, where editors were thinking in terms of talent "stables" that worked exclusively for each editor. A new editor, Carl Potts, was looking for projects, so Grant and Zeck pitched a Punisher miniseries to him, and Potts accepted it, over much objection from Marvel management, who told him that he bore full responsibility for it.

The miniseries premiered with a January 1986 cover date. It was bannered on the cover as the first of four; although the series had always been intended to be five issues long, and the banner was an error that recurred throughout the entire run. The plot changed from Grant's initial story, though the basic concept remained the same. An important element of the story was a retcon that explains that many of the Punisher's more extreme actions to this point were the result of being poisoned with mind-altering drugs.

An ongoing series, also titled The Punisher, premiered the next year. Initially by writer Mike Baron and artist Klaus Janson, it eventually ran 104 issues (July 1987 – July 1995) and spun off two additional ongoing series—The Punisher War Journal (80 issues, November 1988 – July 1995) and The Punisher War Zone (41 issues, March 1992 – July 1995), as well as the black-and-white comics magazine The Punisher Magazine (16 issues, November 1989 – September 1990) and The Punisher Armory (10 issues, no cover dates, starting 1990), a fictional diary detailing "His thoughts! His feelings! His weapons!" (as stated on the cover of issue #1). The Punisher also appeared in numerous one-shots and miniseries, and made frequent guest appearances in other Marvel comics, ranging from superhero series to the Vietnam War-era comic The 'Nam.

During this era, the Punisher was assisted by his then-partner, Microchip. Serving as a Q type figure, he would supply the Punisher with high-tech vehicles and equipment such as armored combat "battle vans" specially built and customized.

Over the next decade, the Punisher would be shown fighting virtually every known criminal organization, including the Italian Mafia, the Russian Bratva, the Japanese Yakuza, the Colombian and Mexican drug cartels, the Aryan Brotherhood, the Chinese Triads, Jamaican Yardies, the Irish Mob, biker gangs, street gangs, gunrunning militias, muggers, killers, rapists, psychopaths, violent racists, sadists, pedophiles, and corrupt city officials. He also assaults criminal business enterprises such as drug trafficking, weapons smuggling, money laundering, and human trafficking.

Due to the Punisher's homicidal nature, few of his foes became recurring antagonists, the most notable of these being the severely-scarred enforcer Jigsaw and the brutal sadistic mercenary Barracuda. The Punisher also acquired a nemesis in the form of the Kingpin, a longtime Spider-Man and Daredevil foe, and developed enmity with Daredevil himself, who likewise abhorred and fought against the Punisher's brutal methods. Villains such as the Jackal, Bushwacker, Doctor Doom, the Reavers and Bullseye would be used to provide more of a challenge for the character. In addition, heroes such as Spider-Man, Captain America, Daredevil, Ghost Rider, the Hulk, Wolverine, Nick Fury, and Moon Knight – and, on at least two occasions, the preadolescent team Power Pack – would appear. Often the stories would use the appearance of those heroes to provide commentary on the difference between the Punisher and those more colourful characters. During Don Daley's run on The Punisher title, his version of justice was described by the editor as "an eye for an eye".

Decline
In 1995, Marvel canceled all three ongoing Punisher series due to poor sales. The publisher attempted a re-launch almost immediately, with a new ongoing series Punisher, under the new Marvel Edge imprint, by writer John Ostrander, in which the Punisher willingly joined and became the boss of an organized crime family, and later confronted the X-Men and Nick Fury. The series ran for 18 issues, from November 1995 to April 1997. Writer Christopher Golden's four-issue Marvel Knights miniseries The Punisher: Purgatory (November 1998 – February 1999) posited a deceased Punisher resurrected as a supernatural agent of various angels and demons. This version of the character also appeared in a 4-issue mini-series co-starring Wolverine.

Revivals
A 12-issue miniseries by writer Garth Ennis and artist Steve Dillon, again titled The Punisher (April 2000 – March 2001), under the Marvel Knights imprint, revived the character's popularity. An ongoing series titled The Punisher (37 issues, August 2001 – February 2004), primarily by Ennis and Dillon, followed, succeeded in 2004 by an ongoing Ennis series under Marvel's mature-readers imprint, MAX. Returning the character to his lone vigilante roots, those series combined crime-focused stories with black humor. The look of the Punisher was modified further removing the white gloves and pairing his traditional skull imprinted shirt with combat trousers, black combat boots and a black trench coat. Castle has used this costume on occasion in mid-2000s stories before The Punisher War Journal vol. 2.

MAX imprint

Continuing his run on the character, Garth Ennis used the freedom of the MAX imprint to write more realistic and hard-edged stories than had previously been seen. Ennis has stated that he would "like to see less superheroes"; this desire is reflected in the gritty, realistic tone and the anti-heroic portrayals of both the title character and Nick Fury, who made two guest appearances in the series. Punisher also made it explicit that Castle's timeline was fixed, while Marvel adjusted those of its other characters, with his history never altered or moved up in time. Promotional art for the cover of Punisher vol. 6, #44 (March 2007), gave his birth date as February 16, 1950, but that was removed for the published issues. After the departure of Ennis as writer, the series was renamed Punisher: Frank Castle with issue #66.

The imprint depicts the Punisher being active for almost 30 years, with Punisher vol. 6, #19 (June 2005), specifying he had killed approximately 2,000 people. Whereas the traditional Punisher stories remained within the United States and involved antagonists and settings of conventional domestic crime, stories of the MAX Punisher often focus on current events, ranging from corporate fraud to sexual slavery and the War on Terror. Many characters are past or current intelligence and military operatives from governmental agencies like the American CIA, the Soviet KGB, and the British SIS and SAS, as well as various militaries and militias from the Balkans and Middle East, including the IRA, all with agendas rooted in past conflicts like the Cold War or the Yugoslav Wars.

The miniseries Born by Garth Ennis and Darick Robertson further examines Castle's roots, tracing them back to his third tour of the Vietnam War, where he undergoes a psychological and possibly supernatural transformation into the Punisher to survive a massive assault on his fortification by the combined forces of the Viet Cong and the North Vietnamese Army. The one-shot Punisher: The Tyger, by Ennis and John Severin, went even further and showed that Castle had lived with murders, deaths and criminals from his childhood.

The MAX version of the Punisher ends with the character's death. After killing the Kingpin, Castle dies from his own wounds in issue #21 of PunisherMAX. He is buried in issue #22 as his death sparks a public uprising and killing of the city's criminals.

Punisher War Journal (vol. 2)
In November 2006, a new The Punisher War Journal series, written by Matt Fraction and penciled by Ariel Olivetti, was released. The first three issues of the book are set during Marvel's "Civil War" event. It involves Castle taking on supervillains rather than his traditional non-super-powered criminal antagonists. He has also made appearances in the main Civil War series (issues #5–7). Wearing both his traditional costume and his Marvel Knights/MAX attire, and a new costume designed to look like his costume and Captain America's combined, the series pitted the character against a series of super-powered foes while also being involved in crossover events such as "World War Hulk" and "Secret Invasion".

The Punisher and Punisher: Frank Castle

Marvel relaunched The Punisher War Journal in 2009 as simply Punisher, with a thematic link tied to the events of the "Dark Reign" storyline and, following the departure of writer Garth Ennis, retitled the Marvel MAX series (formerly Punisher MAX) as Punisher: Frank Castle MAX and, more recently, as Punisher: Frank Castle or Frank Castle: The Punisher (depending on the source); launching a new series called PunisherMAX by Jason Aaron and Steve Dillon. As part of his work on the character, Rick Remender wrote the one-shot title Dark Reign: The List – Punisher, which, as part of the "Dark Reign" storyline, shows the character dismembered and decapitated by Daken.

Following this, the main Punisher series was renamed FrankenCastle and featured a Castle who is resurrected by Morbius and the Legion of Monsters as a patchwork, Frankenstein-like creature. He joins up with the Legion of Monsters to help protect the monsters of Monster Metropolis from the Hunter of Monster Special Force. At the conclusion of the series, the character was transformed back into a normal human when he acquired the mystical Bloodstone, with its healing abilities restoring his humanity, although he subsequently chose to discard it despite its healing powers because he recognized that reliance on the stone would result in its side-effects eventually affecting his judgment so that he would lose the ability to recognize innocents.

Punisher: In the Blood
In 2010, a Punisher series was released titled Punisher: In the Blood. It is a five-part series that is meant to take place after FrankenCastle. In this series, the Punisher faces Jigsaw once again.

The Punisher (2011)
A violent gang war resulted in the murders of nearly 30 people at a wedding reception, including the groom, leaving the bride, U.S. Marine Sergeant Rachel Cole-Alves, a widow just hours after getting married. Frank had connections with one of the detectives on the case and used the information he gave him to kill members of the Exchange, the group responsible, before the police had a chance to question them.

Later, the Punisher loses an eye while fighting a new version of the Vulture. The Punisher later confronts a recuperated Rachel Cole-Alves in a Hotel where members of the Exchange were meeting. Together they kill the members. It is later revealed to be part of a plan to lure the Punisher to 727 Varick level 19 suite A. Both Rachel Cole-Alves and the Punisher go to the location only to find it to be a trap. They later find out that Daredevil has the Omega Drive. Later Rachel Cole-Alves and the Punisher find Daredevil and Spider-Man. They then work together to destroy the drive.

The Punisher and Cole-Alves later succeed in killing the heads of the Exchange, but in the process, Cole-Alves accidentally kills NYPD Homicide Detective Walter Bolt. On the run from the NYPD, Cole-Alves eventually tries to commit suicide by police, only to be captured and sent to prison. Castle eludes capture.

Cole-Alves is sentenced to death for her crimes. Meanwhile, Spider-Man confronts Castle, but he manages to escape. Spider-Man then talks to the Avengers, stating that Castle is a problem and needs to be taken care of. Wolverine, believing that lethal methods are sometimes justified, refuses to assist. Black Widow tracks Castle to South America, where they fight to a standstill before Widow gets distracted by a group of mercenaries guarding a town full of sick villagers, abandoning the fight to help them. Thor pursues Castle next, although all he wants is to talk Castle into turning himself in.

Castle sneaks back into the US to try and break Cole-Alves out of prison. The Avengers set a trap, figuring Castle would target a transport unit. Castle sees through the deception, and rescues the real Cole-Alves by disguising himself as Iron Man. Wolverine was later revealed to be the source of his information, and Logan helps Cole-Alves escape while Castle stays behind to battle the Avengers and buy time. Castle ends up in a special underwater prison, while Cole-Alves resurfaces in Los Angeles, shooting a mugger while wearing the Skull insignia.

Thunderbolts
As part of the Marvel NOW! event, the Punisher becomes a member of Red Hulk's Thunderbolts. Their first mission is to take down the civilian-murdering dictator of an island nation.

The Punisher (2014)
As a part of All New Marvel Now, The Punisher solo series is written by Nathan Edmondson and illustrated by Mitch Gerads. The Punisher moves to Los Angeles following a drug trail, and he is being targeted by a military hit squad.

Original Sin
During the Original Sin storyline, the Punisher becomes involved in the investigation of the murder of Uatu when he is recruited by an unknown agent – later revealed to be Nick Fury – to track various deceased eldritch creatures with Doctor Strange, their combined occult and firearm knowledge allowing them to determine what killed various creatures that Fury had killed in his career as 'the Man on the Wall'.

Secret Wars
During the Secret Wars storyline, the Punisher crashes the Kingpin's viewing party of the incursion between Earth-616 and Earth-1610. He informs the villains present that since he cannot take them with him, he is going to have to do something with all of his bullets.

After massacring the supervillain gathering, the Punisher is approached by the Howling Commandos, who request his aid in completing one final mission before the world ends. The Punisher agrees to help, and is airlifted to Tikrit, where he works on "punishing" the Black Dawn, a terrorist group that had been filming themselves executing American hostages, including a former associate of the Punisher's. The Punisher decimates the Black Dawn, and dies from gunshot wounds as the Earth is destroyed by the Incursions.

All-New Punisher and Civil War II: Kingpin
After Earth-616 has been restored, Frank Castle returns from the dead and comes back to New York City, to continue his personal war against criminal organizations and enterprises. His first target is a former mercenary outfit called Condor, that is currently selling a drug called EMC to terrorists and gang members because it gives users enhanced confidence, perception, strength and pain tolerance. During Frank's first bust on a Condor drug warehouse, he runs into his former Special Ops C.O. Ray Schroder (aka Olaf) who is currently working for Condor but gives Frank a folder of important intel on Condor's EMC operation, before departing. With his new mission to take down Condor before they can get EMC into the worst hands, the Punisher is followed by a D.E.A. Agent whose drug bust on Condor was disrupted by his, as well as a sadistic killer named Face who is also second-in-command of Condor.

In the Kingpin Civil War II storyline, Castle goes to eliminate Fisk and his criminal empire. During the fight, Castle wounds Fisk's legs with his combat knife, and falls out of a window.

Secret Empire
During the Secret Empire storyline, after Steve Rogers – his history 'rewritten' by the sentient Cosmic Cube Kobik so that he believes that he has been a Hydra sleeper agent since childhood – arranges a mass coup of America, the Punisher eventually appears targeting the former criminal Boomerang – now acting as an information broker for the underground Maria Hill – and apparently loyal to Hydra. He then reports to Steve Rogers about his mission. The Punisher later crashes Black Widow's attempts to take down Hydra Supreme Steve Rogers. The Punisher and Black Widow continue to battle until Black Widow stabs the Punisher in the thighs. The Punisher explains Hydra Supreme Steve Rogers's overall plan to use the Cosmic Cube is to put everything back to the way it was. Not just the Axis victory in World War II, but bringing back all of the dead as a result of Hydra like Rick Jones, Jack Flag, and Frank Castle's family. Black Widow rejects this idea and sees Miles approaching Hydra Supreme Steve Rogers causing Black Widow to stop Hydra Supreme Steve Rogers and Miles Morales. After the real Captain America defeated his Hydra Supreme counterpart, the Punisher expresses regret for his actions in an inner monologue, calling his involvement with Hydra Supreme Rogers as probably the worst mistake of his life. He is shown atoning for his involvement with Hydra by killing every Hydra agent he can find. Upon the Punisher blowing up the abandoned warehouse where some Hydra agents were hiding, he is being observed by Nick Fury Jr. who speaks over the comms that the Punisher is ready.

Marvel Legacy and Fresh Start 
Some time after the events of Secret Empire, Nick Fury Jr. gives The Punisher access to the War Machine armor in order to combat a rogue state using old S.H.I.E.L.D. resources. During the aftermath of the operation, Frank resumes his war on crime in New York with the War Machine armor, only to surrender it after James Rhodes was revived. Despite wanting to atone for his sins for unknowingly working for Hydra, combined with the death of Natasha at the hands of a Hydra Supreme counterpart of Steve Rogers, the Punisher is still a fugitive, having gone too far in hunting the remaining Hydra remnants on his brutal crime fighting spree. After surrendering the War Machine Armor out of respect of the revived Rhodes, the Punisher surrenders to the authorities but was secretly freed by the Winter Soldier and a recently revived Natasha (the latter, now in a cloned body).

The comic was relaunched in 2018, by writer Matthew Rosenberg and artist Riccardo Burchielli. The story ditched the War Machine armor, but kept the idea of the Punisher operating at the international level, dealing with an ill-fated battle against Baron Zemo.

A new 13 issue series began in 2022 with Jason Aaron serving as the writer and art from Jesús Saiz and Paul Azaceta. It showcase Castle serving as an assassin of the ninja organization The Hand.

Characterization
The character has been described as being obsessed with vengeance; Garth Ennis noted that the character of the Punisher "sees the world in very black and white terms, he solves his problems with utter finality" and that "his response to any problem: when in doubt, hit back hard." The writer Steven Grant noted that:

Punisher co-creator Gerry Conway stated that "He's a great Rorschach test. What's given him some sustainability is, you can put into him whatever you want, as opposed to Spider-Man, who truly is who he is and shouldn't be changed. The Punisher is a thin character on his own merits, but that allows for a lot of interpretations and different angles of approach."

The Punisher's backstory initially introduced him as a veteran of the Vietnam War. In this capacity, he appeared in the comic book The 'Nam, about the conflict. However, this dated the character as the years passed and the war was increasingly in the past. Greg Rucka retconned it to the War on Terror, instead, in 2011. He explained that

He also clarified that the retcon was only for the character in the main Marvel universe and not for the version in the MAX Comics, that retained the first origin. The conflict was retconned again in 2019, in History of the Marvel Universe #2, to the fictional Siancong War.

Skills, weapons, and abilities
The Punisher is the recipient of intense infantry training from the United States Marine Corps and special operations training by Force Recon. As a Recon Marine he went through Airborne School, Ranger School, BUDs, the Q-Course, and SERE; as well as cross-training with the Australian SASR during the Vietnam War. From this training, the Punisher is proficient in not only basic infantry and special operations skills, but the use and maintenance of specialized firearms, equipment, and explosive ordnance. He is highly trained in infiltration into heavily guarded enemy territories and structures for the purpose of assassination, capture, and military intelligence. As a Scout/Sniper he is highly trained in various forms of camouflage and stealth in different environments. He is also highly proficient at hand-to-hand combat, and has been trained in multiple forms of martial arts such as Chin Na, Hwa Rang Do, Krav Maga, Muay Thai, Nash Ryu Jujutsu, Ninjutsu, Shōrin-ryū Karate and Systema. Both Nick Fury and Tony Stark have commented on how extraordinarily high his pain tolerance is. He refuses to take painkillers, as he feels that their benefit of dulling pain is not worth the side effects of drowsiness and slowed reflexes.

He maintains multiple safehouses and vehicles around the greater New York City area as well as multiple forged identities and bank accounts (most of the funds and equipment aiding him in his work being taken from the criminals he hunts). The Punisher has a Kevlar uniform which protects him from most gunfire, though he can still suffer concussive injury or penetration from sufficient or repeated impacts. The white skull emblem on his chest is used both to intimidate his enemies and to lure their fire to the more heavily protected area of his armor. The design was supposedly taken from either a Vietcong sniper, or the demon Olivier. The Punisher uses a large variety of firearms in his war on crime; including fully automatic rifles, shotguns, flame throwers, or whatever he can get his hands on. Though he has a preference for guns, the Punisher has been using technology derived from super-villains and other costumed characters, such as the Green Goblin's pumpkin bombs, a modified Goblin Glider, and a Doctor Octopus tentacle that he can shrink down for easy storage via Pym Particles. For a time after the death of Jim "Rhodey" Rhodes at Thanos' hands, the Punisher would be offered the War Machine armor by Nick Fury, Jr. to apprehend a rogue S.H.I.E.L.D. cell.

Aside from his physical prowess, the Punisher demonstrates superb intensive focus and mental discipline, providing a strong resistance against psychic and telepathic powers that are used against him. When Letha and Lascivious try to manipulate his aggression, for example, he scoffs at their attempt, saying, "It doesn't feel different from any other day".

Supporting characters

Despite wanting to work alone, the Punisher has a few supporting characters to help fight crime. Microchip assisted Castle by building and supplying weapons and technology and providing friendship. During the "Civil War", he was aided by Stuart Clarke for a short time. Various police officers and detectives have assisted the Punisher, most notably Lynn Michaels and Lt. Martin Soap. Lynn Michaels was a police officer who teamed up with Castle to take down a serial rapist and later quit the force to become a vigilante. Martin Soap was secretly allied with the Punisher and gave him information on his targets from the police database.

In politics and popular culture

Australia

Military personnel
Australian Special Forces units operating in Iraq and Afghanistan are known to wear Punisher iconography. 2nd Commando Regiment and SASR members have been photographed on patrol wearing 'death symbols' including the Punisher logo, Spartan helmets and skulls. This led to a ban by Chief of the Defence Force Angus Campbell beginning in 2017 and included flags, patches and stencilled logos. Significant pushback from the Veteran Community regarding the ban was received but as of 2022 Australian Defence Force standing orders continue to enforce the ban.

United States

Military personnel

The Punisher's skull first became noticeably visible as a symbol during the Iraq War by US military personnel. Service members would use the skull as an unofficial service patch or paint it on equipment. This was most notably done by Navy SEALs of SEAL Team 3 during the Second Battle of Fallujah in 2004.  Chris Kyle popularized the usage in his autobiography, later filmed as American Sniper: "We spray-painted it on our Hummers and body armor, and our helmets and all our guns. We spray-painted it on every building or wall we could, We wanted people to know, We're here and we want to fuck with you."

Militia groups

In addition to being used by the United States military and police, the Punisher's skull emblem is used by far right anti-government militias, such as the 3 Percenters (a group dating back to 2008), and the symbol was seen at the 2017 Unite the Right rally.

Law enforcement
Since 2015, the skull emblem became popular within police officers' Blue Lives Matter movement, with many companies producing decals, stickers, and T-shirts featuring the Punisher emblem colored with the thin blue line, or atop an American flag. In 2017, the Catlettsburg Police department in Kentucky faced a public backlash after installing large decals with the Punisher's skull and "Blue Lives Matter" on the hoods of police cars, and removed the decals in response to public pressure. Citizens and police interpreted its meaning differently; the police chief said, "We're getting so many calls, and they're saying that the Punisher logo (means) we're out to kill people, and that's not the meaning behind that. That didn't cross my mind."

Firefighters
A variation of the Punisher's skull has been used by EMS/Firefighters. The skull is similar to the police version but the blue line is replaced with a red line.

Reaction

Punisher co-creator Gerry Conway has decried the use of the Punisher symbol by law enforcement, saying, "To me, it's disturbing whenever I see authority figures embracing Punisher iconography because the Punisher represents a failure of the Justice system. ... The vigilante anti-hero is fundamentally a critique of the justice system, an example of social failure, so when cops put the Punisher's skulls on their cars or members of the military wear Punisher's skull patches, they're basically siding with an enemy of the system." Conway compares it to "putting a Confederate flag on a government building." After members of the Detroit Police Department have been observed to be wearing the Punisher skull during the George Floyd protests in 2020, Conway and others have called on Marvel and its parent company Disney to take legal action to prevent law enforcement from using the logo.

This controversy was addressed in Punisher Vol. 12 #13 written by Matthew Rosenberg in July 2019. In the issue, Frank comes across two police officers who are fans of his. They take a selfie with him and show they have a sticker of his logo on their car before comparing their work to his. Unimpressed, the Punisher tears up the sticker and tells them, "I'll say this once, we're not the same. You took an oath to uphold the law. You help people. I gave that up a long time ago. You don't do what I do. Nobody does. You boys need a role model? His name's Captain America, and he'd be happy to have you.... If I find out you are trying to do what I do, I'll come for you next." In 2020, Marvel said this was their official opinion on the use of the image.

Iraq 
From the early 2000s, the Punisher rapidly gained popularity in Iraq. By 2015, his logo had become widely used by the Iraqi Armed Forces and Iraqi paramilitary groups. According to researcher Aymenn Jawad Al-Tamimi, many Iraqis just thought that the logo was "cool" despite the widespread anti-Americanism in the country.

Reception

Critical reception 
David Harth of CBR.com referred to the Punisher as one of the "best anti-heroes in Marvel Comics," saying, "The Punisher made his debut fighting Spider-Man but would go on to much bigger and better things. Gaining insane popularity in the '80s, the Punisher's logo is one of the most recognizable in all comics. Even non-fans know his deal – Frank Castle fights a never-ending battle against crime, trying to avenge his family's death by killing as many bad people as he can. Just a regular guy with a lot of training and ordinance, the Punisher is still one of the most formidable vigilantes in the Marvel Universe, even able to smack around superpowered heroes. The Punisher wasn't the first gun-toting vigilante, but he would redefine that type of character for a new era." Darby Harn of Screen Rant called the Punisher one of the "best antiheroes in Marvel Comics," writing, "The Punisher takes the antihero concept much farther than Wolverine. Wolverine obeys a strict code, which Frank Castle ostensibly does, but the results differ greatly. Frank Castle hunts down and murders criminals with extreme prejudice, operating outside the law and caring very little for the consequences. Though his actions stem from a need for justice for his murdered family, his violent behavior echoes that of the people he hunts so much that the distinctions are negligible." Noel Murray of Inverse described the Punisher as one of the "greatest antiheroes of all time," asserting, "Though the character debuted in a Spider-Man comic in 1974, the Punisher became a phenomenon in the late ‘80s, when his no-quarter-given approach to crime-fighting synched up with the tough talk of the Reagan era. Later takes on the character have restored some moral ambiguity to an antihero whose militancy makes him a fascinating case study in what we’re willing to accept in exchange for security."  Empire named the Punisher one of the "greatest comic-book characters," stating, "The Punisher is now one of the most iconic characters in the entire Marvel stable. A 'Nam vet driven by his family's murder to punish all criminals by death, it's perhaps not unsurprising that the dark, disillusioned '70s was the decade that saw a brutal, uncompromising psychopath (for that's what Castle is, no debate) become a fan favourite. Although, truth be told, operating within the confines of the toothless main Marvel titles never sat well with The Punisher – in recent years, with the move to the MAX label, and Garth Ennis' soon-to-finish installation as Punisher guru, the dark heart and psychology of Frank Castle has been fully explored, giving a new insight into this grimmest and most compelling of characters."

Accolades 

 In 2008, Wizard Magazine ranked the Punisher 39th in their "Top 200 Comic Book Characters" list.
 In 2012, IGN ranked the Punisher 27th in their "Top 100 Comic Book Heroes" list.
 In 2018, GameSpot ranked the Punisher 23rd in their "50 Most Important Superheroes" list.
 In 2019, CBR.com ranked the Punisher 1st in their "Marvel: 10 Best Assassins In The Comics" list and 9th in their "10 Most Powerful Heroes Of Marvel Noir" list.
 In 2019, Empire, ranked the Punisher 19th in their "50 greatest comic-book characters" list.
 In 2019, Comicbook.com ranked the Punisher 42nd in their "50 Most Important Superheroes Ever" list.
 In 2020, Inverse ranked the Punisher 9th in their "50 greatest antiheroes of all time" list.
 In 2020, CBR.com ranked the Punisher 10th in their "Marvel’s 10 Greatest Marksmen" list.
 In 2022, The A.V. Club ranked the Punisher 88th in their "100 best Marvel characters" list.
 In 2022, Screen Rant ranked the Punisher 1st in their "10 Best Antiheroes In Marvel Comics" list.
 In 2022, Screen Rant included Punisher in their "10 Best Marvel Characters Who Made Their Debut In Spider-Man Comics" list.
 In 2022, CBR.com ranked the Punisher 3rd in their "25 Best Anti-Heroes In Marvel Comics" list, 5th in their "10 Strongest Daredevil Villains" list, 8th in their "10 Most Villainous Marvel Heroes" list, 8th in their "10 Best Members Of Marvel's Legion Of Monsters" list.

Literary reception

Volumes

Punisher - 2004 
According to Diamond Comic Distributors, Punisher #1 was the 20th best selling comic book in January 2004. Punisher #2 was the 24th best selling comic book in January 2004. 

Joey Esposito of IGN ranked the Punisher comic book series 15th in their "25 Best Comic Runs of the Decade" list, writing, "The run of Garth Ennis on Punisher stems back beyond our ten year timeline, including a 12-issue series that featured the celebrated story, "Welcome Back, Frank." But after that, Ennis rejuvenated the character most notably under Marvel's MAX imprint, which allowed not only for extreme violence and language (which suits Frank's world more than most Marvel heroes), but for the real-time aging of the character." Jared Gaudreau of CBR.com ranked the Punisher comic book series 7th in their "10 Best Punisher Comics" list, saying, "In 2004, one of the most iconic and influential comic runs of all time started with Garth Ennis' Punisher MAX. Serving as Volume 7 of the ongoing Punisher title, Punisher MAX is famous for its consistent depiction of Frank Castle as a vigilante and anti-hero. In Punisher MAX issues 30-36, Punisher is pitted against Barracuda, a mercenary with an extensive history in the US military. Facing off a number of times throughout the six-issue arc, it's made very apparent that Barracuda is not an everyday mercenary and is more than capable of matching Frank's brutality."

Punisher - 2009 
According to Diamond Comic Distributors, Punisher #1 was the 33rd best selling comic book in January 2009. Punisher #2 was the 39th best selling comic book in February 2009.

Dan Phillips of IGN gave Punisher #1 a grade of 7 out of 10, asserting, "Because the main feature of the series is so simple and fast-moving, there's not much else to say about this issue other than I found it entertaining. Remender kept me at the edge of my seat, and artist Jerome Opena did a good job capturing the energy of this chase, even if his work is a little too rough around the edges in places. All in all, I'd say the premise of Punisher trying to kill Norman Osborn is an interesting one; I just don't know how long they'll be able to milk it without convincing fans that Norman could actually die in a Punisher comic."

Punisher - 2011 
According to Diamond Comic Distributors, Punisher #1 was the 25th best selling comic book in August 2011. Punisher #2 was the 30th best selling comic book in August 2011. 

Ryan K. Lindsay of CBR.com called Punisher #1 a "face-stomping crime comic," stating, "With a new #1, "The Punisher" relaunch under the 'Big Shots' banner is going to be a treat. It reads well, it looks just as good, and will appeal to a broad audience. It'll be interesting to see over subsequent issues how Rucka's vision for this character plays out. This issue delivers a ballet of blood that kick starts a myth of a man of death. You could almost call this 'The Ballad of Frank Castle' and you'd have the tone nailed down." Erik Norris of IGN gave Punisher #1 a grade of 8 out of 10, saying, "For those anticipating Frank Castle's return to a solo series in the main Marvel Universe, The Punisher #1 should satisfy. The book introduces new, interesting characters to the ensemble cast, shows Frank Castle doing what he does best, and maybe most exciting of all, doesn't tiptoe around the violent world that Frank Castle has succumbed to being a part of. If only Checchetto's art was more consistent, then we would have a do-not-miss slam dunk. But even so, The Punisher #1 still comes highly recommended. Welcome back, Frank."

Punisher - 2014 
According to Diamond Comic Distributors, Punisher #1 was the 18th best selling comic book in February 2014.

Benjamin Bailey of IGN gave Punisher #1 a grade of 7.5 out of 10, asserting, "As a huge fan of the character, I'm just excited to have the Punisher back in a series all his own with a solid creative team telling his tales. It's only the first issue, but there's enough promise here to warrant a commitment from fans of the skull-wearing vigilante. Here's hoping for a long run, filled with bullets, blood, and action. That's all we really want and need out of a Punisher series. The Punisher brings our favorite skull-wearing vigilante back into the spotlight in a storm of bullets, violence and death. There's nothing new here, but any time Frank comes back is a good time indeed. Glad to have you back, Mr. Castle."

Punisher - 2016 
According to Diamond Comic Distributors, Punisher #1 was the 3rd best selling comic book in May 2016.

Bob Franco of ComicsVerse called Punisher #1 a "must read," writing, "As a first installment, this issue sets The Punisher off to a good start. There’s not a lot of explanation, but there doesn’t need to be yet. It’s reminiscent of the circumstances Frank surges through in the Netflix DAREDEVIL series, though Frank is mute through this first issue: not a word spoken, nor a thought given. Everything we know has been told to us, so there’s real intrigue to see how this series progresses. It’s a book that gives little character examination but makes one pine for more." Jesse Schedeen of IGN gave Punisher #1 a grade of 8.2 out of 10, saying, "Frank Castle is in fine form after taking a few months away from the spotlight. This new series doesn't do anything dramatically different with the franchise (not yet, at least), but it does feature a hands-off approach to the lead character and introduce some intriguing new villains to the mix. The series also proves that Steve Dillon isn't simply content to rest on his laurels after so many Punisher projects. This is a solid start to what may become a very memorable Punisher run."

Punisher - 2018 
According to Diamond Comic Distributors, Punisher #1 was the 11th best selling comic book in August 2018. Punisher #1 was the 121st best selling comic book in 2018.

Jenna Anderson of Comicbook.com stated, "There's an interesting dichotomy within The Punisher #1—as things are getting smaller and more back to basics for Frank, the consequences of his actions seem to be getting larger and larger. Considering the ways the character has been interpreted over the years, that choice is a complex, but decidedly powerful one, which could bode well for the series as it continues to go on. It's anyone's guess as to how this all will resolve for Frank, or what kind of man he will be when his chickens come to roost. But there's enough within this new-ish iteration of The Punisher to make fans eager to follow along for the ride." Joshua Davison of Bleeding Cool wrote, "The Punisher #1 isn't exactly the stripped-down Frank Castle story I think many were expecting after the War Machine story, but it is Frank going back to his old methods of urban guerrilla warfare with the occasional frigging tank mixed in for good measure. It's not exactly smart or profound, but it is a fun read with great artwork and worth a recommendation. Check this one out."

Punisher - 2022 
According to Diamond Comic Distributors, Punisher #1 was the 15th best selling comic book in March 2022.

Hannah Rose of CBR.com called Punisher #1 a "gory yet stunning premiere," asserting, "The Punisher himself has gotten a makeover beyond his sleek new outfit and updated logo, fresh for his cultish recruitment. He appears more fresh-faced than in previous recent incarnations, even romantic at moments. Considering that Punisher #1 is something of a fresh start for the character and his continuity, this new look is fitting. Punisher #1 is a major departure for Frank Castle, but this opens his character up to whole new explorations. What happens when the Punisher gets everything he wants? Punisher #1 gives the audience a few ideas and plenty of material for the next issue to work with."

Other versions

Punisher 2099

First version

The Marvel 2099 universe follows the story of Public Eye police officer, Jake Gallows, after the murder of his mother, brother and sister-in-law. Gallows comes across Frank Castle's war journal in the Public Eye archives, and took the mantle as the new Punisher. At first he follows Frank's old code of justice, only killing those who hurt the innocent. He later loses his mind, at one point proposing murdering two people simply because they were having sex with each other. He is later named Minister of Punishment in Doctor Doom's 2099 government. He is joined by Polly, a lab-bred humanoid who becomes his partner.

Marvel Knights version
Marvel Knights' Punisher 2099, another take on the year 2099, featured Cassondra Castle who goes by the alias of Cossandra Natchios. She is the daughter of Frank Castle and Elektra Natchios and has a son named Franklin. When she is diagnosed with cancer, Cossandra sets out to teach her son everything he needs to know to become the next Punisher. Upon her death, Franklin chooses not to take over, allowing the Punisher title to end with his mother.

Amalgam Comics
In Amalgam Comics, the Punisher is merged with Steve Trevor to make Trevor Castle. In this continuity Trevor Castle lost his family when they were caught in a gang war, which led him to become the Punisher and eventually marry Diana Prince, with whom he had a son named Ryan before they separated. In Bullets and Bracelets, Ryan is kidnapped which leads to Trevor and Diana to work together to figure out who is responsible. Their search leads them to Thanoseid, who apparently kills their son. Trevor was about to kill Thanoseid's personal assassin Kanto, but was stopped by Diana who figured out Kanto was actually Ryan.

Wanting revenge on Trevor for indirectly causing the death of his own son, Thanoseid sent Ryan back in time to become Kanto so that either Trevor will kill his son or Kanto would kill his father. With his plan foiled, he sent Trevor and Diana back to Earth, with the two deciding to give their relationship another chance.

Frank Castle
Alternative versions of the Punisher have appeared for over three decades. The earliest examples of those alternative versions can be found within the monthly What If series. Using existing Marvel stories as a starting point, the series examined scenarios in which, for example, Frank Castle's family has not died or he had killed Daredevil in their first encounter. Other "what if" stories looked at his adventures as a new Captain America or as an agent of S.H.I.E.L.D. Garth Ennis wrote a one-off special entitled Punisher Kills the Marvel Universe where Frank Castle kills every superhero and supervillain in the Marvel Universe after his family are caught in the crossfire of a battle with the Brood.

The Punisher also featured in a number of more extended looks at alternative universes and lives such as the Age of Apocalypse's Frank Castle (as a man who fled genocide to become a monk).

House of M
In the alternative universe House of M, Castle appears as a media vigilante nicknamed the "Punisher" and is recruited after his arrest by John Proudstar to join and be the other human in the strikeforce known as the Brotherhood.

A Man Called Frank
The Punisher: A Man Named Frank, written by Chuck Dixon, was a western themed take on the character. Castle is a cowboy during the time of the American Old West who is out for revenge to the criminals who killed his family.

Marvel Noir
In The Punisher Noir, Frank Castelione is a veteran of World War I who has a winged version of a skull tattooed on his chest. His wife died from cancer and Castelione is killed by Jigsaw, Barracuda and the Russian after a fight. His only son is the Punisher, patterning himself after a radio pulp series. This version of the Punisher wears a mask emblazoned with his trademark skull (similar to Crossbones) which is later carved into his chest by Jigsaw. The Punisher fights against a criminal conspiracy controlling the entire city, and kills Barracuda by ripping him in half.

Marvel Zombies vs. The Army of Darkness
In this universe, Frank takes advantage of the fact that the heroes and law enforcement officers are busy with zombies and he hunts and shoots down the super-villain leadership of New York City, known as the Kingpin, The Owl, and Hammerhead. Along the way he allies himself with Ash Williams, who he intends to help battle the zombie threat. When Ash sees him kill the still human criminal trio he becomes disgusted and mistakenly abandons the Punisher minutes later. This leaves Frank to be attacked and infected by a squad of zombies, causing him to at first be "killed". Frank returns as a zombie and turns Ash's ally, the Scarlet Witch into one. The Punisher appears in Marvel Zombies: Evil Evolution, where he appears zombified along with other zombies attacking the Marvel Apes.

Marvel Mangaverse
In the alternative universe Marvel Mangaverse continuity, Sosumi Brown is Tokyo's Punisher, who fights the crime family of Skang Kee Ho. That family uses an Oni (Japanese demon) named Oni Yew to try to stop her, but her sister, Hashi Brown, finds out about her secret. In the process, she obtains a cursed weapon which she uses to slay the Oni and save her sister.

MC2
In the alternative-future universe of MC2, the Punisher is still active, but has moved to South America to deal with the level of drug runners there. He returns to New York after hearing of a gang war between Black Tarantula and a Maggia don called Silverback, whom he had once crippled, but now has cybernetic implants. He eventually dies in a final confrontation with Silverback.

Old Man Logan
In the possible future timeline depicted in the "Old Man Logan" storyline that takes place on Earth-21923, the Punisher shows up to help fight the villains during the days the villains rose to power. He shot Electro before he was stabbed in the chest during a sneak attack from Kraven the Hunter. He survived the attack and resumed his war on crime, killing Nuke and other criminals. 50 years later, the Punisher finds that a gang calling themselves the "Punishers" has been tarnishing his reputation by killing men and kidnapping children in light of the Hulk Gang having most of its members killed. In addition, the Punisher is shown to have a failing memory as the Punishers have stolen his war journal. This causes the Punisher to assist Old Man Logan in attacking the stronghold of the Punishers to save the kidnapped children. Fighting the Punishers' leader,  Panhead, he is fatally injured. When Panhead is killed, the Punisher reclaims his war journal and looks at the picture of his late family as he peacefully dies.

On Earth-807128, a new Kingpin captures two men who have taken up the mantles of the Punisher and Daredevil after they along with Ashley Barton / Spider-Bitch apparently tried to destroy his empire. Chained to posts in a stadium and in full view of a crowd, the new Punisher and Daredevil are gruesomely dispatched by carnivorous dinosaurs as they ask after the imprisoned Ashley. After being freed by her father, Ashley kills Kingpin before attempting to kill her father, revealing that she and the new Daredevil and Punisher had actually sought to take over the former Kingpin's empire themselves, with Ashley becoming the new Kingpin of the Wastelands.

Ruins
Following his interview with Rick Jones at his apartment in Chicago, Phil Sheldon trips over the corpse of the Punisher in the snowfall.

Venomverse
On Earth-TRN651, Frank Castle led a war on crime for years, until the Kingpin organized the crime families of New York against him, Frank found himself hunted by the criminal underworld. Growing desperate, Frank made a deal with the Venom Symbiote, the symbiote would allow him to kill Fisk and 'win' his war on crime, on the condition that Frank would kill one target for the symbiote. This target was revealed to be Spider-Man, an innocent, and Frank tried to resist the symbiote as it formed a rifle in his hands. Fortunately for Frank, a Venomized Doctor Strange chose that moment to transport them into a war between Venoms and Poisons, inadvertently saving Spider-Man's life. He was unfortunately assimilated by a Poison along with his symbiote, thus creating Poison Punisher.

Later he was present in the Hive's invasion of the Prime Marvel Universe and was able to bond Spider-Man to a symbiote. He continued to face off against that universe's heroes, also successfully bonding Devil Dinosaur to a symbiote, but was soon killed when Agent Anti-Venom arrived and attempted to free him from the Poison, only to find he was hollow, having been already consumed by the Poison.

Cosmic Ghost Rider

In the alternate reality of Earth-TRN666, where Thanos conquered all the Universe, Frank Castle's early life was seemingly similar to that of the Frank Castle of the Earth-616 Universe. However, when Thanos came to Earth, the Punisher was one of the last casualties during the last stand of the heroes and his soul was subsequently sent to Hell. Willing to give anything in order to punish Thanos for slaughtering his planet, the Punisher signed a demonic deal with Mephisto and became the Ghost Rider. When he returned to Earth, however, Thanos was already gone and everything on the planet was dead. Roaming endlessly and undying with no one to kill or love, the Ghost Rider spent the next countless years alone. He eventually began to lose his mind when even Mephisto fell silent to his calls. When a badly injured Galactus arrived on Earth seeking help against Thanos, unaware that the population of Earth had already been killed by him, the Ghost Rider offered the dead planet to him in exchange for the chance of punishing the Mad Titan as his herald which the Great Devourer accepted. Bestowed with the Power Cosmic, Frank Castle became Cosmic Ghost Rider.

Ultimate Marvel
The alternative universe Ultimate Marvel version of Punisher is Frank Castle, an ex-NYPD police officer whose family was killed by corrupt police officers who knew he was going to expose them. He manages to kill the one responsible for his family's death after sympathetic cops "accidentally" place him as the man's cellmate. After he unsuccessfully tried to kill Boomerang, he later kills corrupt cop Jeanne De Wolfe. In Ultimate Comics: Avengers 2, the Punisher is defeated and arrested by Captain America. He is saved from the death penalty by Nick Fury orchestrating his release from custody in exchange for joining the Avengers. After being equipped with a Captain America-inspired costume, he is implanted with a chip that delivers a violent electric shock whenever he disobeys orders. Being knocked out by Hawkeye, it allowed him to escape after the fight between the two Ghost Riders.

In Ultimate Avengers vs New Ultimates, he was incarcerated after assassinating the Russian criminal known as the Red Hammer and is later visited by Fury persuading him to rejoin the Avengers by offering him revenge on his fellow prisoners. While the Avengers were battling the New Ultimates, the Punisher was aiming a sniper rifle at Captain America's kneecap with the intention of immobilization. However, Spider-Man swung in and took the hit from the Punisher's bullet instead. Horrified that he had shot a kid, he begged the S.H.I.E.L.D. agents that arrived shortly afterwards to "punish him". After the Punisher and the Avengers were arrested by S.H.I.E.L.D., they took Tyrone Cash's serum and temporarily gained Hulk-like powers. They confronted the new S.H.I.E.L.D. Director Gregory Stark, but are easily defeated thanks to Stark's Nanite-based suit. The Avengers later assisted the New Ultimates against Stark's Spider in Korea. In the conflict's aftermath, the Punisher is last seen torturing the other convicts in prison.

What If
In What If...the Punisher's Family Had Not Been Killed in Central Park?, Castle's family does not die in the park and he joins the police force following his discharge from the Marine Corps. However, Frank tries to collect evidence on corrupt cops, but they attack Frank's house in the middle of the night, killing Frank's family and his brother-in-law. Castle returns to kill those who murdered his family, making Frank become the Punisher after all. However, a major divergence from his mainstream version's modus operandi includes providing proof of his targets' wrongdoing to the press.
In "What If The Punisher Had Killed Spider-Man?", an alternative version of the events depicted in The Amazing Spider-Man #129, the Jackal successfully dupes the Punisher into killing Spider-Man and abandons him to take the fall in his place. Becoming a hunted fugitive, the Punisher eventually hunts Warren down and intends to surrender him to the police. But when the NYPD is about to arrest him instead, threatening to kill him should he shoot Warren, Warren is executed (off-panel) by the Punisher after the latter gleefully concludes the story with the words: "See you on the other side, Jackal.".
In What If, Captain America is seriously injured in a fight with the Red Skull (an alternative ending of Captain America #212) and converted into a cyborg, which drives him to bestow his uniform upon another candidate. Castle is eventually chosen, and although he first pursues his family's killers in his usual alter ego, after a talk with the recovered Steve Rogers and some soul-searching he becomes a new and worthy Captain America.
In What If, Frank is possessed by Venom instead of Eddie Brock. With the Punisher as Venom, he goes on a rampage killing several villains including Tombstone and the Kingpin. He eventually confronts the symbiote and they work together.
In What If...Wolverine Had Become the Lord of Vampires?, Frank is chosen by the spirit of Doctor Strange to fight the vampires. Frank does so by killing Cyclops, Nightcrawler, Colossus, Storm, and Juggernaut, all of whom became vampires. When Frank fights Wolverine, he accidentally kills Kitty Pryde, causing Wolverine to kill him.
In What If features Wolverine becoming the Punisher during the 1920s.
In What If... Peter Parker Became the Punisher?, Peter Parker's history echoes his 616 counterpart, but he becomes a vigilante that kills people with specialized bullets using a wrist chaingun attached to his webshooters. His costume is a mixture of Spider-Man and the Punisher. After killing the Sinister Six and the Green Goblin, he ultimately retires the Punisher persona to avoid putting his loved ones in danger. However, this results in a local crime organization killing Frank Castle's family. While escaping the scene, Frank stumbles upon Peter's costume in the trash, suggesting he will become the next Punisher.

Age of X
In the X-Men crossover Age of X, another universe's General Frank Castle commands a mutant-hunting version of the Avengers.

Marvel Universe vs The Punisher
In this alternate universe, an unknown pathogen transforms the entire superhuman population, as well as basic civilians, into zombie-like cannibals. Five years prior, the Punisher raided a Mafia deal in a warehouse, incidentally releasing the plague. Due to being overly exposed to the pathogen, he has gained a special immunity from the virus. He is one of the few people immune to the pathogen, the others being Hawkeye and Wolverine.

During the beginning days of the outbreak, Wolverine sought out Frank after getting a tip from Reed Richards that someone with Frank's M.O. was present when the virus was released. When confronted, Frank recounted the events which occurred eighteen months prior to when the virus was released, revealing that all it did was make him sick for a few weeks. Richards, overhearing their conversation via radio, determines that Frank's overexposure to the pathogen has given him a special immunity and that he is humanity's best chance at getting a cure. After fighting to the Baxter Building, both men find that the building's emergency generator has stopped working and the security team has been slaughtered. Upon further investigation, they find a badly injured Reed, who tells them that both the Thing and Beast have turned with the latter feasting upon Hank Pym.

Later, following a failed counterattack against a large cannibal army led by an infected Hulk, the Punisher, Deadpool, and Captain America save a badly injured Wolverine, who lost his arm in the battle. The four later coordinate two diversions while Mr. Fantastic and Black Panther lead a convoy of scientists out of the city so they could begin work on a cure in a safe location. Frank and Captain America launch an offensive against a large cannibal horde, though Captain America begins to succumb to the plague and begs Frank to kill him before he turns. A solemn Frank obliges and is soon confronted by Hawkeye, who witnessed the execution.

Weeks later, Frank continues to fight the horde alongside other uninfected heroes. He is one of few heroes who do not accept Dr. Doom's offer of wearing a Doom Stone to prevent the infection. Frank, Hawkeye, and Black Widow end up being the last uninfected heroes in New York after the surviving heroes are forcibly turned by Doctor Doom using Doom Stones to accelerate the turning process. Though they attempt to save their fellow heroes, their attempts are in vain and Black Widow is kidnapped by Spider-Man, while Frank leaves Hawkeye and goes out in search of him. Frank later witnesses Hawkeye's murder at the hands of Thor, leaving him as the last uninfected person in New York.

Five years later, the Punisher hunts for the first known infected, Spider-Man in a New York City that has been depopulated. Castle is constantly bugged by a cannibalistic Deadpool, who he has killed over 35 times. While out on patrol, Frank encounters an elderly priest and a young boy who have been surviving in the ruins of New York. While the Priest attempts to appeal to Frank's humanity in hopes that the infected can be saved, Frank coldly tells him that the only way to win is to kill them all.

They are soon confronted by Spider-Man, who offers Frank and the remaining human survivors safe passage out of the city in exchange for returning his wife to him from Kingpin. The Punisher rescued a pregnant Mary Jane Parker from the hands of a flesh-eating Kingpin and his cohorts. At the end, Mary Jane looks on aghast as Castle kills Spider-Man and sends off the survivors. The Punisher stays behind on Manhattan to continue his hunt for cannibals.

Spider-Gwen
In this alternate universe, Captain Frank Castle of the NYPD is called in to take over for George Stacy in the hunt for Spider-Woman. He was a veteran of the wars in Afghanistan and the Second Gulf War, where he and Maria Walls were the only survivors of a massive firefight. The two later marry and have 2 children. He then worked as a mercenary for Tony Stark's private military company, WAR MACHINE. After that stint, he joins the NYPD, rapidly rising through the ranks. On the day he was named to take over the Spider-Woman case, he finds a note that Maria and the children have left him, and Frank finds himself now only focusing on his job.

After following the Vulture on an attack on George Stacy, Castle takes on both the Vulture and Spider-Woman, the latter of whom brutally beats Castle, though Castle does see her unmasked face, he is unaware of her actual identity; Castle subsequently takes on the forces of the Hand, and the Kingpin, Matt Murdock.

In other media

The character of the Punisher has appeared in many types of media. Since his first appearance in 1974, he has appeared in television, films, and video games—each on multiple occasions—and his name, symbol, and image have appeared on products and merchandise.

Notes

References

External links

 
 

 
Characters created by Gerry Conway
Characters created by John Romita Sr.
Characters created by Ross Andru
Comics about the United States Marine Corps
Comics characters introduced in 1974
Crime comics
Fictional American military snipers
Fictional characters from New York City
Fictional Gulf War veterans
Fictional gunfighters in comics
Fictional Italian American people
Fictional mass murderers
Fictional mercenaries in comics
Fictional military captains
Fictional sole survivors
Fictional torturers and interrogators
Fictional United States Marine Corps Force Reconnaissance personnel
Fictional Vietnam War veterans
Marvel Comics adapted into films
Marvel Comics adapted into video games
Marvel Comics film characters
Marvel Comics male characters
Marvel Comics martial artists
Marvel Comics military personnel
Marvel Comics television characters
Punisher characters
Vigilante characters in comics